
Shealtiel, transliterated in Greek as Salathiel, was the son of Jehoiachin, king of Judah. (1 Chronicles) The Gospel of Matthew 1:12 also list Shealtiel as the son of Jeconiah (line of Solomon). Jeconiah, Shealtiel, as well as most of the royal house and elite of the House, were exiled to Babylon by order of Nebuchadnezzar II of Babylon after the first siege of Jerusalem in 597 BC. During the Babylonian captivity, Shealtiel was regarded as the second Exilarch (or king-in-exile), following his father.

Name
In Hebrew, the name Shealtiel means, Shə’altî ’Ēl, "I asked El (for this child)". The name acknowledges that the son is an answer to the parents' prayer to God (El) to help them conceive and birth a child. Many Hebrew names similarly express the importance of, difficulty of, and thankfulness for a successful pregnancy.

Shealtiel is a significant, though controversial, member in the genealogies of the House of David and of the genealogy of Jesus. Though both genealogies of Jesus list Zerubbabel as the son of Shealtiel, they differ as to Shealtiel's paternity with Matthew 1:12 agreeing with 1 Chronicles that Jeconiah was Shealtiel's father and Luke 3:27 having Shealtiel as the son of an otherwise unknown man named Neri.

The author of the Deuterocanonical apocalyptic work 2 Esdras describes himself as "I, Salathiel, who am also called Ezra". For this reason, the work is also sometimes known as Ezra Shealtiel.

Genealogy in the Hebrew Bible

The Hebrew Bible has conflicting texts regarding whether Zerubbabel is the son of Shealtiel or Pedaiah. Several texts (that are thought to be more-or-less contemporaneous) explicitly call "Zerubbabel the son of Shealtiel". The Seder Olam Zutta also supports that position. Surprisingly, the Hebrew text of  makes Zerubbabel a nephew of Shealtiel: King Jehoiachin is the father of Shealtiel and Pedaiah, then Pedaiah is the father of Zerubbabel.

Various attempts have been made to show how both genealogies could be true. One explanation suggests Shealtiel died childless and therefore Pedaiah, his brother, married his widow according to a Jewish law regarding inheritance. If so, Zerubbabel would be the legal son of Shealtiel but the biological son of Pedaiah.

The other speculation suggests the title "son of Shealtiel" does not refer to being a biological son but to being a member in Shealtiel's household (bet). The Hebrew term "father" (av) can refer to a father of a household, similar to the Latin term paterfamilias. In this sense, a man who is the "father" of a household can therefore be referred to as the father of his own biological siblings, nephews and nieces, or anyone else who cohabitates in his household. Zerubbabel (and possibly his father Pedaiah) could be called a son if they lived in Shealtiel's household.

Perhaps both speculations could be true. Zerubbabel could be the legal son of Shealtiel and therefore also a member of his household. Notably, if Shealtiel had no biological children, Zerubbabel as a legal son would have inherited Shealtiel's household and become its new father with authority of over the other members of the household.

Another speculation simply suggests that the text which identifies Zerubbabel as a son of Pedaiah could be a scribal error. It occurs in a part of the text where the Hebrew seems discongruent and possibly garbled. The expected mention of Shealtiel being a father seems accidentally omitted, and thus his children became confused with Pedaiah's. The Greek Septuagint actually lists Shealtiel (and not Pedaiah) as Zerubbabel's father.

In any case, those texts that call Zerubbabel "son of Shealtiel" have a context that is overtly political and seems to emphasize Zerubbabel's potential royal claim to the throne of the Davidic Dynasty by being Shealtiel's successor. Zerubbabel is understood as the legal successor of Shealtiel, with Zerubbabel's title paralleling the High Priest Jeshua's title, "son of Jozadak", that emphasizes Joshua's rightful claim to the dynasty of highpriests, descending from Aaron. Therefore, with one descending from David and the other from Aaron, these two officials have the divine authority to rebuild the Temple.

The most common alternative spellings of Shealtiel are Salathiel (though this sometimes comes directly from the Bible), Saltel, Salatiel, Saltell, Saltial, Saltiel, Saltiél, Σαλτιέλ, Schaltiel, Scialtiel, Scieltiel, Sealthiel, Sealtiel, Sealtiël, Seltiel, Shaaltiel, Shalltell, Shaltiel, Shaltieli, Shealthiel, Shealtiel, Sjaltiel and Sjealtiel. Derivations include Chaaltiel, Chaltel, Challtelli, Chaltiel, Chartiel, Cheltiel, Saltelli, Saltellus, Salter (generally unconnected with the contemporary surname), Saltijeral, von Saltiel and Xaltiel.

Genealogy in the Gospels
Both genealogies of Jesus regard Shealtiel (and not Pedaiah) as the father of Zerubbabel. Matthew lists Shealtiel as the son of Jeconiah, while Luke lists a man named Shealtiel who is the son of an otherwise unknown man named Neri. (Matthew 1:12 and )

References

Books of Chronicles people
Gospel of Matthew
Exilarchs
6th-century BCE Jews
Jewish royalty